Anterior compartment may refer to:

 Anterior compartment of the forearm
 Anterior compartment of leg
 Anterior compartment of thigh